Smokin Jo (born Joanne Joseph) is an English DJ and record producer from London, England. She is the only female DJ to win the number one DJ in the world award by DJ Mag in 1992.

Musical career
She began her career in 1990 when she got her first set of record decks. In 1991, Jo was given an opportunity to play at London hardhouse/techno club Trade at Turnmills. This led to a residency there that would continue until 1993, launching her career. In 1993 she DJed in Ibiza for the first time, on the terrace at Space. the same year she was named as DJ Magazines No1 DJ. She also presented the BBC Radio 1 (essential selection) weekly report from Ibiza, between 2002 and 2006.

Jo has gigged all over the world, and in every big club night, playing as far and wide as Japan, Germany, Brazil, Greece, USA (including Space in Miami), and Singapore. In the UK she has played Fabric in London. She has kept a residency in Ibiza.

Awards and nominations

DJ Magazine

Top 100 DJs

DJ Awards

Discography

Compilation albums
Infinite Ibiza, White Island Music, 2001.
 Trust the DJ: SJ01, in 2002.

DJ Mixes albums
White Island Fever, MuzikMagazine, 2001.
Full Intention and Smokin'Jo-Defected Sessions, Enter Records, 2002
Smokin Jo and Tim Sheridan – Sessions, Ministry of Sound, 2005. 
Smokin'Jo-Terrace Mix, MixMag, 2006.

Singles and EPs
Yoni (11), Smokin'Jo, Suck on This (12"), Sugarcube Recordings, 1997. 
Malcom Duffy meets Smokin'Jo-Bean Hut (12"), Remote Recordings, 1999.
Yanu-House, House Tempo Records, 27 July 2001. 
Psycho Bitch EP, Fluential Records, 2001.
Smokin'Jo (EP & TP, 12"), Fluential Records, 2001.
Psycho Bitch EP, Feel the Rhythum Records, 2002.
Smokin'Jo and Pete Heller-Present Sleepers (2) – Fishbone (12"), Junior London Recordings,2002. 
Pete Gleadall and Smokin'Jo Present Los Vengadores – The Music (12"), Whoop! Records,2003.
Smokin'Jo and Washington-Present Black Europeans-The State of Mind (12"),Distraekt Records, 2003. 
Umona – 3 Versions, Area Remote Records, 2009.
Native Dance – 2 Versions, Area Remote Records, 2010.Smokin'Jo and Nichole Moudaber – Home Sweet Home (12"), Yellow Tail Records, 2010.
Heads Down – 2 Versions, Area Remote Records, 2012.
Smokin'Jo and Falomir – I see sunrise (12") Area Remote Records, 2014. 
Nichole Moudaber and Smokin Jo – Can't say no to that (12") Doppleganger, 2014. 
Nichole Moudaber and Smokin Jo – Home sweet home (Dub Version) (12") ADSR Records, 2014.
Smokin'Jo  – What's going on (12") Doppleganger, (2015).

References

External links
Official site: .
Smokin'Jo Discography at Discogs.

Living people
Club DJs
English women DJs
DJs from London
English house musicians
Remixers
English dance musicians
English record producers
British women record producers
Year of birth missing (living people)
English women in electronic music
Electronic dance music DJs